The IWA Mid-South Light Heavyweight Championship is one of the major titles in the Independent Wrestling Association Mid-South. The title debuted as the Lightweight Title in 1996, evolving to the current weight class in 1998.

Title history

References

External links
IWA Mid-South Title Histories
 IWA Mid-South Light Heavyweight Championship
Light heavyweight wrestling championships
IWA Mid-South championships